Mikael Rimstedt is a Swedish contract bridge player. Mikael is a World Champion. Playing with his twin brother Ola Rimstedt, they won the World Open Pairs in Orlando in 2018.

Bridge accomplishments

Wins
 World Youngsters Team Championship (1) 2014
 World Open Pairs (1) 2018

Runners-up

References

External links
 
 

Swedish contract bridge players
Year of birth missing (living people)
Living people
Place of birth missing (living people)